Detective Quiz was a Canadian half-hour television series that debuted September 10, 1952 on CBC Television. The show was hosted by Morley Callaghan, who presented clues to help viewers guess the criminal. The show was cancelled after three weeks.

External links 
 
 TV Archive article

1952 Canadian television series debuts
1952 Canadian television series endings
1950s Canadian game shows
Black-and-white Canadian television shows
CBC Television original programming